is a type of Japanese pottery traditionally from Kōge, Tottori prefecture.

External links 
 http://inkyuuzan.ftw.jp
 http://www.pref.tottori.lg.jp/32522.htm

Culture in Tottori Prefecture
Japanese pottery